The governor of Maluku (Indonesian: Gubernur Maluku) is the first-level regional head in Maluku (province) along with the deputy governor and 45 members of the . The governor and deputy governor of Maluku are elected through general elections which are held every five years. The current governor of Maluku is Murad Ismail and the deputy governor is Barnabas N. Orno.

List of governors

List of colonial governors
The Moluccas have been colonized by Portuguese, Spaniards, Dutch, English and finally independence as a part of Indonesia. Below is a list of governors.

See also
 List of rulers of Maluku

References

.
Maluku
Maluku Islands governors